Salmon Street Springs, or Salmon Street Fountain, is an outdoor water fountain at the intersection of Naito Parkway at Southwest Salmon in Tom McCall Waterfront Park in Portland, Oregon, United States. It was designed by Robert Perron Landscape Architects and Planners and dedicated in 1988. The fountain's three water displays, which are regulated by a computer, are called "bollards", "misters", and "wedding cake".

Salmon Street Springs is considered "interactive" and open from 6:00am to 10:00pm during the Spring, Summer, and Fall months.

See also
 Fountains in Portland, Oregon

References

External links
 

1988 establishments in Oregon
Fountains in Portland, Oregon
Southwest Portland, Oregon
Tom McCall Waterfront Park